N11 or rijksweg 11 is a freeway in the province of South Holland in the Netherlands. It is connecting Zoeterwoude, Alphen aan den Rijn, and Bodegraven.

Motorways in the Netherlands
Motorways in South Holland
Alphen aan den Rijn
Bodegraven-Reeuwijk
Zoeterwoude